Rogoźnik may refer to the following places in Poland:
Rogoźnik, Lower Silesian Voivodeship (south-west Poland)
Rogoźnik, Lesser Poland Voivodeship (south Poland)
Rogoźnik, Silesian Voivodeship (south Poland)